Moshrageh District is a district (bakhsh) in Ramshir County, Khuzestan Province, Iran. At the 2006 census, its population was 13,216, in 2,766 families.  The district has one city Moshrageh. The district has two rural districts (dehestan): Azadeh Rural District and Moshrageh Rural District.

References 

Ramshir County
Districts of Khuzestan Province